The Netherlands Antilles competed at the 1996 Summer Olympics in Atlanta, United States.

Athletics

Men
Field events

See also
Netherlands Antilles at the 1995 Pan American Games

References
Official Olympic Reports

Nations at the 1996 Summer Olympics
1996 Summer Olympics
Olympics